In Our Image is an album by The Everly Brothers, originally released in 1966.

Several of the songs had appeared on singles in 1965, where their biggest success came in the United Kingdom off the back of "The Price Of Love" (present on this album) and "Love Is Strange" (from Beat & Soul), the former of which ascended to No. 2 on the UK Charts, but only No. 104 in America.

Included on the album also was the flipside for "The Price Of Love", "It Only Costs A Dime", a self-written piece.

In December of that year, the final single "It's All Over" appeared, in an arrangement containing harpsichord and vocals. In a break from the usual routine, however, this song would feature Phil singing the principle vocal line and Don singing the harmony line a third lower. The song would later be covered by Cliff Richard.

Revisiting their classic style of singing, they recorded the Sonny Curtis-written "I Used To Love You". Curtis, former member of The Crickets, had previously written another Everly Brothers hit single, "Walk Right Back".

For the first 45 release of 1966, they visited the songwriting partnership of Barry Mann and Cynthia Weil, with a rendition of "Glitter And Gold". This arrangement, featuring fuzz guitar and harpsichord, was backed with another Brill Building number, the Howard Greenfield and Jack Keller-written "Lovey Kravezit".

With hardly enough time to gauge the success of this single "(You Got) The Power of Love" (written by Delaney Bramlett and Joey Cooper), containing Motown influences aplenty and backed with "Leave My Girl Alone", was to hit the stores.

Filling out the album, "The Doll House Is Empty" (later to become Warner Brothers single 5689 in February 1966), the mainstream-orientated "(Why Am I) Chained To A Memory"  (Edward A. Snyder/Richard Ahlert) and "June Is As Cold As December" from Marge Barton.

Track listing

Side one
 "Leave My Girl Alone" (Bernie Baum, Bill Giant, Florence Kaye, Kenny Lynch) – 2:22
 "(Why Am I) Chained to a Memory" (Eddie Snyder, Richard Ahlert) – 2:07
 "I'll Never Get Over You" (Phil Everly, Don Everly) – 2:09
 "The Doll House is Empty" (Howard Greenfield, Jack Keller) – 2:00
 "Glitter and Gold" (Barry Mann, Cynthia Weil) – 2:40
 "(You Got) The Power of Love" (Delaney Bramlett, Joey Cooper) – 2:37

Side two
 "The Price of Love" (Phil Everly, Don Everly) – 2:07
 "It's All Over" (Don Everly) – 2:19
 "I Used to Love You" (Sonny Curtis) – 2:15
 "Lovey Kravezit" (Inspired by the Columbia Motion Picture The Silencers) (Howard Greenfield, Jack Keller) – 2:37
 "June is as Cold as December" (Marge Barton) – 2:52
 "It Only Costs a Dime" (Phil Everly, Don Everly) – 1:57

References

1966 albums
The Everly Brothers albums
Warner Records albums
Albums produced by Dick Glasser